Mt. Lebanon is a township with home rule status in Allegheny County, Pennsylvania, United States. The population was 34,075 at the 2020 census. It is a suburb of Pittsburgh. Established in 1912 as Mount Lebanon, the township was a farming community. With the arrival of the first streetcar lines and the development of the first real estate subdivision, both in 1901, it became a streetcar suburb, offering residents the ability to commute to Downtown Pittsburgh. Further, the opening of the Liberty Tunnel in 1924 allowed easy automobile access to Pittsburgh. In 1975, the renamed Mt. Lebanon adopted one of the first home rule charters in Pennsylvania.

History
The first European settlers arrived in 1773–1774, having purchased the land from the descendants of William Penn; other pioneers soon bought land from the state government.

In 1912, Mount Lebanon Township was incorporated as a "First Class Township" under Pennsylvania state law. It had formerly been a part of Scott Township, which in turn traces its origins to the long-defunct St. Clair Township. Mount Lebanon was not named for two Cedar of Lebanon trees that were planted in 1850 on Washington Road near the top of Bower Hill Road, but was named after the area from which they came, Mount Lebanon, due to the similarities between the two landscapes. Prior to the incorporation of the township, the "Mount Lebanon" name was used for the area of Upper St. Clair Township near the cedar trees.  In the 1880s, a post office located near the transplanted cedar trees was named "Mount Lebanon".  Incorporators of neighboring Dormont Borough initially tried to use the "Mount Lebanon" name in 1909, but were opposed by residents of the future Mount Lebanon Township.

In 1928, Mount Lebanon became the first First Class township in Pennsylvania to adopt the council–manager form of government and has had an appointed manager serving as the chief administrative officer since that time.

Mount Lebanon was a farming community until the arrival of streetcar lines, the first line to Pittsburgh opening on July 1, 1901 followed by a second in 1924. After the arrival of the streetcar lines, which enabled daily commuting to and from Downtown Pittsburgh, Mount Lebanon became a streetcar suburb, with the first real estate subdivision being laid out in November 1901.  Further, the opening of the Liberty Tubes in 1924 allowed easy automobile access to Pittsburgh. Between the 1920 and 1930 censuses, the township's population skyrocketed from 2,258 to 13,403. Today, Pittsburgh's mass transit agency, the Pittsburgh Regional Transit, or "PRT," operates a light rail system whose Red Line, which runs underneath Uptown Mt. Lebanon through the Mt. Lebanon Tunnel, merges with the Blue Line in Pittsburgh's Mt. Washington section. Mt. Lebanon's only platform station, Mt. Lebanon Station, is in Uptown Mt. Lebanon; the adjacent Dormont Junction and Castle Shannon stations are in neighboring municipalities. And as of the census of 2000, there were 33,017 people living in Mt. Lebanon.

In 1971, Muhammad Ali attempted to purchase a home in Virginia Manor, but racial discrimination prevented him from doing so. However, some residents have claimed that the rejection was due to the anticipated publicity and crowds which would result from the sale of the property to Ali.

On May 21, 1974, the electorate approved a home rule charter, which took effect on January 1, 1975; as such, the community is no longer governed under the provisions of the Pennsylvania Township Code. Mount Lebanon became one of the first municipalities in Pennsylvania to adopt a home rule charter. In the charter, the official name of the municipality became Mt. Lebanon, Pennsylvania; the word "Mount" is abbreviated in all government documents, although the U.S. Postal Service continues to use "Mount."

Geography
Mt. Lebanon is located at  (40.375, -80.05).

Surrounding communities
There are two small borders with Pittsburgh neighborhoods to the northeast (Brookline) and north (Banksville). The remainder of the northeast border is with the borough of Dormont. The entire western border is with Scott Township. To the south are the two towns which, due to their comparable size and affluence, are most often compared with Mt. Lebanon: Upper St. Clair to the southwest and Bethel Park to the southeast. To the east is Castle Shannon, and finally, to the east-northeast is Baldwin Township (not to be confused with the Borough of Baldwin).

Commercial districts
Uptown Mt. Lebanon is the central business district and has Washington Rd. (U.S. Rt. 19 Truck) as its main thoroughfare. (U.S. Rt. 19 Truck continues into Pittsburgh and back out into the city's northern suburbs and beyond.)  Uptown Mt. Lebanon is one of the more built up central business districts outside of Pittsburgh, featuring numerous coffee shops, small galleries, pizzerias, and clothing boutiques.  The neighborhood is organized as The Uptown Mt. Lebanon Business and Professional Association.

There are sizable business districts along the borders with Upper St. Clair and Castle Shannon, as well.

Communities within Mt. Lebanon
Neighborhoods within Mt Lebanon include: Beverly Heights, Cedarhurst Manor, Hoodridge Hilands, Mission Hills, Sunset Hills, Virginia Manor, Twin Hills, and Woodridge.

Virginia Manor is an affluent subdivision, with streets designed to follow the natural contours of the land.  Future Governor James H. Duff helped found Virginia Manor in 1929.

Demographics

As of the census of 2000, there were 33,017 people, 13,610 households, and 9,023 families residing in the township. The population density was 5,457.2 people per square mile (2,107.1/km2). There were 14,089 housing units at an average density of 2,328.7 per square mile (899.1/km2).  The racial makeup of the township was 96.21% White, 0.61% Black, 0.07% Native American, 2.29% Asian, 0.01% Pacific Islander, 0.18% from other races, and 0.62% from two or more races. Hispanic or Latino of any race were 0.80% of the population.

There were 13,610 households, out of which 31.3% had children under the age of 18 living with them, 57.3% were married couples living together, 7.2% had a female householder with no husband present, and 33.7% were non-families. 30.6% of all households were made up of individuals, and 13.5% had someone living alone who was 65 years of age or older. The average household size was 2.37 and the average family size was 3.00. The median age was 42 years.

In the township the population was spread out, with 24.8% under the age of 18, 4.0% were 18 to 24, 26.9% were 25 to 44, 25.4% were 45 to 64, and 18.8% were 65 years of age or older. For every 100 females, there were 87.1 males. For every 100 females age 18 and over, there were 82.1 males.

The median income for a household in the township was $60,783, and the median income for a family was $79,744 (these figures had risen to $73,765 and $98,731 respectively as of a 2007 estimate.) Males had a median income of $56,183 versus $37,008 for females. The per capita income for the township was $33,652. About 2.2% of families and 3.5% of the population were below the poverty line, including 2.9% of those under age 18 and 4.8% of those age 65 or over.

Arts and culture

A large portion of Mt. Lebanon is listed as the Mt. Lebanon Historic District on the National Register of Historic Places.  The district contains 3,341 contributing buildings and 21 contributing sites.  Most of the buildings (89%)  are residential, though two commercial areas are included.

The district is a significant example of the transition from a rural agricultural area to a suburb made possible first by the trolley/streetcar, and later by the automobile in the 1920s and 1930s with the opening of the Liberty Tubes in 1924.

Parks and recreation

Mt. Lebanon provides many recreational opportunities for its residents.  Fifteen parks are scattered over  throughout the community.  In addition to the parks, there is an Olympic size swimming pool, open in summer, and a regulation size ice rink and recreation building located adjacent to Mt. Lebanon Park on Cedar Blvd.  Mt. Lebanon also boasts one of the oldest public golf courses in western Pennsylvania and has several tennis and basketball courts which are open year-round.  Other recreational facilities include a Sand volleyball court, bocce courts, platform tennis, a plethora of picnic pavilions and over eight children's playgrounds.
Mt. Lebanon School District's sports teams are a big part of the community. The mascot is currently the Blue Devil, which has occasionally stirred controversy.

Government and politics

Mt. Lebanon is a politically active township; it is represented on the federal and state levels of government by its own residents.  Congressman Conor Lamb, who represents the area in the United States House of Representatives as a part of Pennsylvania's 17th congressional district - is a native and current resident of Mt. Lebanon.  Mt. Lebanon is in  District 37 of the Pennsylvania Senate and is represented by Devlin Robinson who is a resident of Bridgeville, a borough which is close to but not part of Mt. Lebanon. Mt. Lebanon is in the 42nd District of the Pennsylvania House of Representatives and is represented by resident Dan Miller.

The Mt. Lebanon government takes the form of a commission, made up of 5 commissioners - one from each of Mt. Lebanon's 5 wards.

Education

The district has seven elementary schools: Foster Elementary School, Hoover Elementary School, Howe Elementary School, Jefferson Elementary School, Lincoln Elementary School, Markham Elementary School, and Washington Elementary School. The two middle schools are Jefferson Middle School and Andrew W. Mellon Middle School. There is one high school: Mt. Lebanon High School. The district has won multiple National Blue Ribbon School awards. The high school was rated as one of the Top 500 high schools in the United States by Newsweek in 2000 and 1st in Western Pennsylvania by the Pittsburgh Business Times in 2005.

Keystone Oaks High School is physically located in Mt. Lebanon but serving the adjacent communities of Greentree, Dormont and Castle Shannon.  Seton-La Salle Catholic High School, and the St. Bernard school, both Diocese of Pittsburgh schools, are also in Mt. Lebanon.

The Mt. Lebanon Public Library, founded in 1932, is funded almost entirely by the municipality and county. Its home is a $4.2 million building, with shelves for 140,000 books, seats for 165 persons, and more than 50 public computers. When the building opened in 1997, it won an architectural design award and was featured in the architectural issue of Library Journal.

Notable people

 Kurt Angle, Olympic gold medalist in freestyle wrestling and professional wrestler
 Shane Black, screenwriter and director 
 Howard J. Burnett, past president of Washington and Jefferson College; died in Mt. Lebanon, where he resided after his retirement in 1998
 Frank Cappelli, children's musician, raised from age four
 Mark Cuban, businessman and media personality
 Daya, singer
 Dave Filoni, filmmaker and animator (Star Wars: The Clone Wars, Star Wars Rebels)
 Gillian Jacobs, actress
 Joe Manganiello, actor
 Andrew Mason, Groupon founder
 Peter Safar, cardiopulmonary specialist; died in Mt. Lebanon, where he resided as an adult
 Bob Ufer, University of Michigan track and field athlete and radio broadcaster
 Keith Van Horne, NFL football player
 Brian Williams, NFL football player
 Ming-Na Wen, actress, partly raised there and attended high school there
 Ian Happ, Professional baseball player for the Chicago Cubs, Podcaster and Coffee Enthusiast
 Matt Winschel, famed engineer 
 Matt Kennedy Gould, former American television personality and current basketball coach

See also
Denis Theatre

References

External links

Municipal website
Mt. Lebanon Public Library
Mt. Lebanon School District
Mt. Lebanon Fire Department
Mt. Lebanon Magazine
Detail map of historic district

 
Home Rule Municipalities in Pennsylvania
Streetcar suburbs
Populated places established in 1773
Pittsburgh metropolitan area
Home Rule Municipalities in Allegheny County, Pennsylvania
1773 establishments in Pennsylvania